Matthew Hollis (born 1971) is an English author, editor, professor, and poet, currently living in London, England.

Career and background

He was born in Norwich, the son of politician Patricia Hollis and academic Martin Hollis. He has studied at the universities of Edinburgh and York. He presently lives in London, England, writing as well as serving as a tutor for the London Poetry School and working as an editor at Faber and Faber. He is a member of the international educational and cultural enhancement organisation the British Council, taking part in the Arts Council's 'First Lines' program in 2001.

Hollis has published a variety of written works. After its shortlisting for the Forward Prize for Best First Collection, his first full-length collection Ground Water (Bloodaxe Books, 2004) was shortlisted for the Guardian First Book Award (the first time for a poetry book) and for the Whitbread Poetry Award; Ground Water was also a Poetry Book Society Recommendation. Hollis is perhaps best known for the 2011 non-fiction book Now All Roads Lead to France, a critically acclaimed (praise appearing in The Guardian, The Independent, The Wall Street Journal, and others) biography of seminal English poet Edward Thomas. The work won the 2011 H. W. Fisher Best First Biography Prize as well as the 2011 Costa Book Award for 'Best Biography'. The judges for the latter commented: "Dramatic and engrossing. A brilliant biography that moved us all." His most recent work is Waste Land: A Biography of a Poem published on 10/13/22 by Faber and Faber.

See also

Now All Roads Lead to France
Patricia Hollis, Baroness Hollis of Heigham
List of poets

References

External links
 Matthew Hollis reads from Now All Roads Lead to France - video

1971 births
Living people
Alumni of the University of Edinburgh
English male poets